The Big League World Series (BLWS) Asia–Pacific Region (formerly the Far East Region) was one of five International regions that sent teams to the World Series . The Big League division was discontinued by Little League Baseball after the 2016 BLWS. The region's participation in the BLWS had dated back to 1968. It produced the most championships (18) of any region, all won by Taiwan.

Asia–Pacific Region Countries

Region Champions

Results by Country

See also
Asia–Pacific Region in other Little League divisions
Little League — Far East
Asia–Pacific & Middle East
Japan
Intermediate League
Junior League
Senior League

References

Big League World Series
Asia-Pacific
Defunct baseball competitions